Shamlaji Road railway station is a railway station on Ahmedabad–Udaipur Line under the Ajmer railway division of North Western Railway zone. This is situated beside State Highway 5 at Lalpur, Shamlaji in Aravalli district of the Indian state of Gujarat.

References

Ajmer railway division
Railway stations in Aravalli district